The Canadian Air Force (CAF) was a  contingent of two Canadian air force squadrons – one fighter and one bomber – authorized by the British Air Ministry in August 1918 during the close of the First World War. The unit was independent from the Canadian Expeditionary Force and the Royal Air Force (RAF).

In addition to the two squadrons, a CAF Directorate of Air Services was formed, which was a branch of the General Staff of the Overseas Military Forces of Canada. The CAF's first commander, Lt. Col. W. A. Bishop began setting up the squadrons in August 1918. The two squadrons never fought during the war, which ended on 11 November 1918. The squadrons were administered by No. 1 Wing CAF, which was formed in March 1919.

Both squadrons were stationed in the United Kingdom at Upper Heyford and later, Shoreham-By-Sea, Sussex. All aircraft, equipment and training facilities were provided by Britain.  Recruiting, pay and clothing, however, was a Canadian responsibility.

The British government cut funding for the squadrons in June 1919. The Canadian government decided that a permanent peacetime air force was not needed and so both squadrons ceased operations: No. 1 Squadron on January 28, 1920, and No. 2 Squadron on February 5, 1920. Aircraft and associated equipment were sent back to Canada. The Directorate of Air Services was dissolved on 5 August 1920.

This Canadian Air Force was Canada's second attempt at creating a relatively independent air force, the first being the creation of the Canadian Aviation Corps in 1914. Another Canadian Air Force would be established in 1920 as part of the Air Board in Canada and would exist until the Royal Canadian Air Force was established in 1924.

Squadrons 

The two Canadian squadrons were designated a wing, which was commanded by a Wing Commander.  The squadrons were:

 No. 1 (Fighter) Squadron (or No. 81 Squadron RAF)
No. 2 (Day Bomber) Squadron (or No. 123 Squadron RAF)

Primary operational aircraft

The Royal Flying Corps provided three types of aircraft. No. 2 Squadron also had the use of at least three captured Fokker D.VIIs.

No. 1 Squadron
 Royal Aircraft Factory S.E.5A fighter
 Sopwith Dolphin fighter

No. 2 Squadron
 Airco DH.9A bomber

See also
History of the Royal Canadian Air Force
Royal Flying Corps of Canada
Royal Canadian Naval Air Service

References 

Notes

Bibliography
 Greenhous, Brereton; Halliday, Hugh A. Canada's Air Forces, 1914–1999. Montreal: Editions Art Global and the Department of National Defence, 1999. .
 Milberry, Larry (General Editor). Sixty Years – The RCAF and CF Air Command 1924–1984. Toronto: Canav Books, 1984. .
 Roberts, Leslie. There Shall Be Wings. Toronto: Clark, Irwin and Co. Ltd., 1959. No ISBN.

Military units and formations of Canada in World War I
Military history of Canada
Military units and formations established in 1918
Military units and formations disestablished in 1920
Canadian Air Force
Disbanded air forces
History of Canadian military aviation